Sahitya Akademi Translation Prizes are given each year to writers for their outstanding translations work in the 24 languages, since 1989. Sahitya Akademi Translation Prizes for Bodo language started in 2005.

Recipients
Following is the list of recipients of Sahitya Akademi translation prizes for their works written in Bodo. The award, as of 2019, consisted of 50,000.

See also 

 List of Sahitya Akademi Award winners for Bodo

References

External links
 Akademi Translation Prizes For Bodo Language

Bodo
Indian literary awards